Shamsuddin Mollah (1921-1991) is a Awami League politician and the former Member of Parliament of Faridpur-8.

Career
Mollah was elected to parliament from Faridpur-8 as an Awami League candidate in 1973.

Personal life
Mollha's son, MM Shahriar Rumi, was a Bangladesh Nationalist Party politician and member of the central committee of the Party. He retired from politics in November 2015.

References

Awami League politicians
1921 births
1991 deaths
1st Jatiya Sangsad members
Bangladesh Krishak Sramik Awami League central committee members